Alana Kimberly Stewart (born August 20, 1979) is an American socialite, television personality, and model. She is the daughter of singer Rod Stewart and actress and model Alana Stewart. She is of British descent, as her father is originally from England and moved to the United States in 1975.

Early life 
Stewart was born on August 20, 1979, in Holmby Hills, Los Angeles, California. She is the second of Rod Stewart's eight children and second of Alana Stewart's three children. After graduating from Buckley School in Sherman Oaks, California, she spent several years studying acting with coaches Janet Alhanti and Ivana Chubbuck. Stewart studied in London with theatre coaches Barbara Houseman (Central School of Speech and Drama/Royal Shakespeare Company coach) and Penny Dyer (Rada and Central School of Speech & Drama coach) and with singing coach Mark Meylan, who works with The Royal National Theatre.

She is close with both her parents, and also George Hamilton; the father of her older half-brother Ashley Hamilton. She and her brother Sean both consider George to be their stepfather due to his close friendship with their mother.

Career

The Realm by Kimberly Stewart 
In January 2021, Stewart started The Realm by Kimberly Stewart, a luxury organization company based in Los Angeles, New York, and Palm Beach. Stewart and her team offer organization, declutter, unpacking, and design services for closets, bedrooms, bathrooms, pantries, kitchens, offices, garages, and more.

Acting 
Stewart has worked as an actress and brand ambassador. Stewart's American television work includes a leading role in Going to California, written by Scott Rosenberg and directed by Ted Demme, and appearing in one episode of Judd Apatow's series, "Undeclared." Stewart's first film was James Toback′s Black and White, which also starred Robert Downey, Jr. and Jared Leto. In 2011 Stewart starred in the movie Homecoming, written and directed by Sean Hackett.

Fashion 
Stewart has appeared on the covers for Tatler and German Vanity Fair, which Bryan Adams shot; and she has worked with fashion companies including Tommy Hilfiger, American Vogue, L'uomo Vogue, Elle, Italian Vogue, Vanity Fair, MaxMara, Richard Tyler,  Catherine Malandrino, underwear line Ultimo, Tatler, InStyle, House of Field, and Chrome Hearts.

She realized an early ambition, at age 19, when she launched her own fashion collection – "Pinky Starfish." Known for its dresses made from French vintage fabrics, the range was sold in Tracey Ross, Lisa Kline and Barney's.

Modeling 
On September 9, 2008, the Atlanta-based band, "Elevation", released the music video for its single, "Razoreyes", starring Stewart, marking a first in her career.

Stewart posed nude in 2008 in the British society magazine Tatler, along with Peaches Geldof, daughter of the Boomtown Rats′ Bob Geldof, and Leah Wood, daughter of the Rolling Stones′ Ronnie Wood. The photographer was Canadian rocker and photographer Bryan Adams. Stewart had previously posed nude with a crucifix in Italian Vogue.

Personal life 
On April 11, 2011, Benicio del Toro's publicist announced that Stewart was pregnant with their child. Stewart gave birth to a daughter, Delilah Genoveva Stewart on August 21, 2011. Delilah is Rod Stewart's first grandchild.

Filmography 
 Film

 Television

 Music videos

References

External links 
 Spotlight bio of Kimberly Stewart (archived 2010)
 "Profile: Kimberly Stewart" (archived 2010)

1979 births
Living people
Female models from California
American socialites
Participants in American reality television series
Family of Rod Stewart
People from Holmby Hills, Los Angeles